"Mycobacterium avium hominissuis" is a subspecies of the phylum Actinomycetota (Gram-positive bacteria with high guanine and cytosine content, one of the dominant phyla of all bacteria), belonging to the genus Mycobacterium.

Suggested name for Mycobacterium avium avium isolates from humans and pigs.

Based on differences in IS1245 RFLP, 16S-23S rDNA ITS and growth temperature, Mijs et al. 2002. propose to reserve the designation Mycobacterium avium subsp. avium for bird-type isolates. These authors suggest, but not formally propose, the designation Mycobacterium avium subsp. hominissuis for the isolates from humans and pigs.

References

Acid-fast bacilli
avium hominissuis
Subspecies